Thomas Frederick may refer to:

Sir Thomas Frederick, 3rd Baronet (1731–1770), of the Frederick baronets
Thomas Frederick (MP) (1707–1740), MP for New Shoreham (UK Parliament constituency)
Thomas Frederick (Royal Navy officer) (1750–1799), British naval officer

See also

Frederick (disambiguation)